Tony Kart is an Italian company (a brand of OTK Kart Group), that produces racing kart chassis. It was founded in 1958 by Antonio "Tony" Bosio. It is based in Prevalle near Brescia in northern Italy.

Tony Kart chassis have been used to win several races and championships both nationally and internationally. Its drivers have included Formula One stars such as Michael Schumacher, Sebastian Vettel and Jarno Trulli. Tony Kart's product lines include the Kosmic Kart chassis as well as Exprit, RedSpeed, Trulli (few years ago). Vortex Engines company is part of the OTK Kart Group line products.

JM Racing of Carson, California introduced the brand in the USA with drivers Alex Barron, Ryan Hunter-Reay, Danica Patrick, Keith Williamson, Scott Speed and Phil Giebler.  After a long stint with distributor CompCor in the United States, Tony Kart established its own dealer network, employing well-known drivers such as Keith Spicer, David Jurca and Jason Bowles.

Tony Kart won the 1998, 2000, 2004 2006 and 2021 karting World Championships with driver Davide Fore as well as the 2007 and 2008 titles with Marco Ardigò. They also won the world title in 2012 with Flavio Camponeschi, in 2020 with Callum Bradshaw, and most recently in 2021 with Tuukka Taponen and Noah Milell.

External links
 Official  Tony Kart website

Kart manufacturers of Italy
Vehicle manufacturing companies established in 1958
Italian companies established in 1958
Province of Brescia